BHSF may refer to:
Birmingham Hospital Saturday Fund
Beijing No.4 High School, which is also referred to as Beijing High School Four (BHSF)